Davide Silvano Achille Gaiotto (born 11 March 1977) is an Italian mathematical physicist who deals with quantum field theories and string theory. He received the Gribov Medal in 2011 and the New Horizons in Physics Prize in 2013.

Biography
Gaiotto won 1996 the silver medal as Italian participants in the International Mathematical Olympiad and 1995 gold medal at the International Physics Olympiad in Canberra. He was an undergraduate student at Scuola Normale Superiore in Pisa from 1996 to 2000. From 2004 to 2007 he was a post-doctoral researcher at Harvard University and then to 2011 the Institute for Advanced Study. Since 2011 he has been working at the Perimeter Institute for Theoretical Physics in Waterloo, Ontario.

He introduced new techniques in the study and design of four-dimensional (N = 2) supersymmetric conformal field theories. He constructed from M5-branes, which are wound around Riemann surfaces with punctures. This led to new insights into the dynamics of four-dimensional (supersymmetric) gauge theories. With Juan Maldacena he studied these gauge theories using the AdS/CFT correspondence. In 2010 he had with Yuji Tachikawa and Luis Alday, developed the AGT correspondence (named after the authors), a duality in the 6D (2,0) superconformal field theory with compactification on a surface to a conformal field theory on the surface (Liouville field theory).

References

External links 
 Davide Gaiotto's Perimeter Institute Page

1977 births
Living people
21st-century Italian physicists
Theoretical physicists
Princeton University alumni
International Mathematical Olympiad participants
Italian expatriates in Canada